Adam Lach (born 1983 in Poznan) is a Polish photographer based in Warsaw. He is the co-founder of Napo Images and vice president of the Napo Foundation. He photographed for The New York Times, "Le Monde", "GEO", "The New Yorker", "Vice". He is the winner of photo contests including Pictures of the Year International and International Photography Awards. His photo essays were shown at international exhibitions, including Polka Galerie at HSBC in Paris, the Prague Biennale, and the World Photojournalism Festival in Beijing. Between 2010-2012, he taught two subjects ("Press Photography" and "Reportage and New Media") at the Institute of Journalism at the University of Warsaw. Lach concentrated primarily on long-term documentary projects. Lach's photographs focus on people, relationships, emotions, and intimacy. He aims to create a genuine story, unaffected by artificial peripeteia, but marked by his interpretation of the portrayed reality.

Books
 Neverland - 
 Stigma -

Awards

 2018 - Picture of the Year - Grand Press Photo
 2017 - Photobook of the Year for book Neverland - Grand Press Photo, Warsaw, Poland
 2014 – Winner of Beata Pawlak Award for Stigma organized by Stefan Batory Foundation
 2014 – IPA 1st Prize Winner for Book Stigma in Self Published Professional category
 2014 – Picture of the Year, Award of Excellence in Issue Reporting Picture Story for Stigma project
 2011 – II prize in category Sport for single image "Sumo Twins" in Grand Press Photo
 2010 – II prize in category Nature for picture story "The ecological Tragedy in Poland" in the BZWBK Press Photo Contest
 2009 – Honorable mention for picture story "Sacred Refuge" in the BZWBK Press Photo Contest
 2008 – Second Prize for the reportage "The Capital" in category Daily Life in the Newsreportage contest of the "Newsweek Polska"
 2008 – Second Prize for the reportage "The Children of Bermuda Triangle" in category People in the Newsreportage contest of the "Newsweek Polska"
 2008 – Third Prize for the reportage „8 Photographs of Warsaw" in the category „Civilisation" in the BZ WBK Press Photo Contest
 2008 – Second Prize for the reportage „Bogdan Zietek – the Sculptor" in the category „Portrait" in the BZ WBK Press Photo Contest
 2007 – Third Prize for the reportage „Yorkland" in the category „Culture" in the Newsreportaz Contest of the „Newsweek Polska"
 2007 – Special Award of the „Rzeczpospolita" daily for „Suzuki Method" in the BZ WBK Press Photo Contest
 2007 – First Prize for the reportage „World Hairdressing Centre" in the category „Civilisation" in the BZ WBK Press Photo Contest
 2007 – First Prize for the reportage „Suzuki Method" in the category „Society" in the BZ WBK Press Photo Contest
 2007 – Second Prize for the reportage „Suzuki Method" in the category „Culture and Art" Press Photography Contest
 2007 – Third Prize for the reportage „World Hairdressing Centre" in the category „Contemporary Concerns" in the Press Photography Contest

References

External links
 Official Page
 Entry on culture.pl
 Entry on CES Harvard
 Napo Images webside
 The New York Times Lens Blog
 The New Yorker Photo Booth

1983 births
Living people